Mohammad-Javad Bahonar (5 September 1933 – 30 August 1981) was a Shia Iranian theologian and politician who served as the Prime Minister of Iran for less than one month in August 1981. Bahonar and other members of Mohammad-Ali Rajai's government were assassinated by Mujahideen-e Khalq.

Early life 
Mohammad Javad Bahonar was born on 3 September 1933 in Kerman, Iran. His father was a simple tradesman and had a little shop in the city of Kerman. He was the second child of nine, and his family was very poor. As a child, he was taught the Quran at the local Makk-tab-Khaneh (parochial school attended by the students very often at the house of local mullah before national school system was put in place) also learning to read and write Persian. Guided by the Ayatollah Haghighi, he studied at the Masoumieh seminary. At the same time he could obtain the degree of fifth of ancient school.

Education 
Bahonar passed his primary school at Masoumieh School of Kerman. In 1953, he went to Qom Seminary and attended in the class of Ruhollah Khomeini, the leader of Iranian revolution.  He received a PhD in theology from the University of Tehran. Also, he was faculty member of the Tehran University and taught religious lessons and theology.

Revolutionary activities

Before Iranian revolution 
Bahonar was a reviler of the Pahlavi dynasty and had activities against Mohammad Reza Shah that led to imprisonment him in 1963, 1964, and 1975. On 1963, he was jailed for opposing the Shah's White Revolution. Also, during exile of Khomeini in Iraq and France, he continued his revolutionary activities and was an influential member among Khomeini's followers. Bahonar along with Morteza Motahari was active speaker of Hosseiniyeh Ershad, a religious lecture hall in the Tehran.

After Iranian revolution 

Upon release from custody, Bahonar did not engage in further activism until Khomeini became Iran's de facto ruler. For his service in the revolution, Bahonar became the new government's ministry of culture and Islamic guidance in 1981, and was responsible for censoring any media disapproved by Muslim leaders in Tehran. He also directed a purge of all  secular influence from Iranian Universities.

He also became a founding member of the Islamic Republican party and an original member of the Council of Revolution of Iran. Also, he was member of  Assembly of Experts. Bahonar along with Mohammad Ali Rajai purging Iranian universities of western cultural influences which known as the Islamic Cultural Revolution. After the assassination of Mohammad Beheshti on 28 June 1981, he was appointed general secretary of the party where he was also a member of the central committee. Bahonar served as the minister of culture and Islamic guidance under Mohammad Ali Rajai's prime ministry from March 1981 to August 1981. When Rajai became president on 5 August 1981, he chose Bahonar as his prime minister.

Assassination 

Bahonar was assassinated along with Rajai and other members of Islamic Republican Party when a bomb exploded at the party's office in Tehran on 30 August 1981. In Iran, this explosion is known as the Hashteh-Shahrivar bombing. The bomb was set off when one of the victims opened a briefcase. The briefcase was carried by Massoud Keshmiri, a security official at the Islamic Republican Party, to the meeting. One week later, Keshmiri was announced as responsible for planning and execution of the assassination. Keshmiri was identified as an operative of Mujahedin that was supported by Saddam Hussein. He tried to assassinate Rajai and Bahonar on 22 August when Rajai introduced his cabinet to Ruhollah Khomeini. Ahmad Khomeini explained that Keshmiri was with Rajai when they came to see Imam Khomeini. He had a suitcase but they did not allow him to bring it. He died a week before his 48th birthday.

Iranian authorities announced that Massoud Keshmiri, "a close aide to the late President Muhammad Ali Rajai and secretary of the Supreme Security Council, had been responsible." Keshmiri, an MEK member who was thought to have died in the explosion, "was accorded a martyr's funeral" and was "buried alongside Rajai and Bahonar."  Various MEK supporters were arrested and executed in reprisal, but Kashmiri apparently slipped through the dragnet. The reaction to both bombings was intense with many arrests and executions of MEK and other leftist groups.

See also 

 Mohammad-Reza Bahonar, his brother
 Mohammad Beheshti

References

External links

1933 births
1981 deaths
Academic staff of the University of Tehran
Islamic Republican Party secretaries-general
Prime Ministers of Iran
Education ministers of Iran
Assassinated Iranian politicians
Assassinated heads of government
Burials at Behesht-e Zahra
People of the Iranian Revolution
Iranian revolutionaries
Deaths by explosive device
Islamic Association of Teachers of Iran politicians
Combatant Clergy Association politicians
Islamic Coalition Party politicians
People assassinated by the People's Mojahedin Organization of Iran
Council of the Islamic Revolution members
Iranian Shia clerics
Members of the Assembly of Experts for Constitution
People from Kerman Province
Central Council of the Islamic Republican Party members
Faculty of Theology and Islamic Studies of the University of Tehran alumni